Cameron DeVon Ridley (born October 27, 1993) is an American professional basketball player who last played for GNBC of the Basketball Africa League (BAL).

Career
Ridley was a former McDonald's All-American. In his four year career at Texas, he averaged  8.2 points, 6.3 rebounds and 1.9 blocks per game. Ridley averaged 11.1 points, a team-high 8.5 rebounds and 2.8 blocks per game as a senior. He played in 13 games before fracturing his foot and missing all of conference play. He played for the Chicago Bulls in NBA Summer League.

In April 2021, Ridley signed with GNBC from Madagascar ahead of the 2021 BAL season. He made his BAL debut against US Monastir and scored 12 points before falling out with an injury.

BAL career statistics

|-
| style="text-align:left;"|2021
| style="text-align:left;"|GNBC
| 1 || 1 || 16.7 || .750 || – || – || 2.0 || .0 || 2.0 || .0 || 12.0
|-
|- class="sortbottom"
| style="text-align:center;" colspan="2"|Career
| 1 || 1 || 16.7 || .750 || – || – || 2.0 || .0 || 2.0 || .0 || 12.0

References

External links
Texas Longhorns bio

1993 births
Living people
American expatriate basketball people in Japan
American men's basketball players
Basketball players from North Carolina
Basketball players from Houston
GNBC basketball players
Hiroshima Dragonflies players
McDonald's High School All-Americans
Nishinomiya Storks players
Power forwards (basketball)
Sportspeople from Fayetteville, North Carolina
Texas Longhorns men's basketball players